Johann Georg Noel Dragendorff (August 8, 1836 – April 7, 1898) was a German pharmacist and chemist born in Rostock.

Education
He earned his doctorate in philosophy from the University of Rostock in 1861, and following graduation worked for the Pharmaceutical Society of St. Petersburg. From 1864 to 1894 he was a professor of pharmacy at the University of Dorpat. In 1872 he was awarded an honorary doctorate in medicine from the University of Munich. He was the president of the Estonian Naturalists' Society in 1890–1893.

Dragendorff's reagent and Dragendorff's test
His name is associated with Dragendorff's reagent, which is a solution of potassium bismuth iodide used to ascertain the presence of alkaloids. Dragendorff's test is a qualitative test formerly used for bile.

Selected publications 
 Beiträge zur gerichtlichen Chemie (Contributions to forensic chemistry); (1871)
 Die gerichtlichchemische Ermittelung von Giften (Forensic chemical ascertainment of toxins); (1876)
 Die qualitative und quantitative Analyse von Pflanzen und Pflanzentheilen (Qualitative and quantitative analysis of plants); (1882) 
 Die Heilpflanzen der verschiedenen Völker und Zeiten. Ihre Anwendung, wesentlichen Bestandtheile und Geschichte (Medicinal plants of various peoples and times); (1898)

Literature 
 
 Ursula Kokoska: Johann Georg Noel Dragendorff (20.4.1836-7.4.1898). Sein Beitrag zur Gerichtsmedizin, Pharmakologie und Pharmazie an der Universität Dorpat. (Inaugural dissertation to the Free University of Berlin; Berlin, 1983)
 
 Hendrik Randow: Ein Beitrag zur Biographie von Georg Dragendorff (1836-1898). Sein Leben und Wirken für die pharmazeutische Forschung und Lehre. (In: Mecklenburgische Persönlichkeiten und ihre Beiträge zum wissenschaftlich-technischen Fortschritt in der Geschichte. Heft 13 der Reihe Rostocker Wissenschaftshistorische Manuskripte, publ. by the History Department of the Wilhelm Pieck University, Rostock, 1986, pp. 42-47)
 Dragendorff, Johann Georg Noël in BBLD - Baltisches biografisches Lexikon digital (digitalised)

References 
 Pagel Biographical Dictionary (translated from German) 
 Stedman's Medical Dictionary (definition of eponyms)

German pharmacists
19th-century German chemists
People from Rostock
Academic staff of the University of Tartu
1836 births
1898 deaths